OSCL may refer to:

 Organización Socialista del Camino para la Libertad - the Spanish name of Freedom Road Socialist Organization (FRSO)
 Ohio Senior Classical League - the Ohio state chapter of the National Senior Classical League (NSCL);also the college-level affiliate of the Ohio Junior Classical League (OJCL)